ELS or Els may refer to:

Education 
Emerson Literary Society, a social society at Hamilton College
 Empirical legal studies
 English Language School, Dubai
 Europeesche Lagere School, a school system in the colonial Dutch East Indies
 Expeditionary learning schools, in the United States

Medicine and science 
 Early Life Stage test, a chronic toxicity test
 Eaton–Lambert syndrome, a muscle disease
 Editor in the Life Sciences, a professional certification
 ELS cotton (Gossypium barbadense), a species of cotton
 Encyclopedia of Life Sciences, an online encyclopedia

People 
 Els (given name), a feminine given name short for Elisabeth
 Ernie Els (born 1969), South African golfer
 Jurie Els, South African singer

Technology 
 Electrophoretic light scattering
 Engineered Lifting Systems & Equipment, a Canadian manufacturing company
 Ensemble de Lancement Soyouz, a launch pad at Guiana Space Centre
 Extreme Loading for Structures, structural analysis software
 Emergency Light System, emergency lighting installed on emergency vehicles

Other uses 
 Els (Streu), a river in Germany
 East London Airport, in South Africa
 Edinburgh Labour Students, a student wing of the Labour Party of the United Kingdom
 Equidistant letter sequence, a bible code method
 Escanaba and Lake Superior Railroad, in the United States
 Evangelical Lutheran Synod, a US-based Protestant Christian denomination
 Liberation Army of the South, an armed group active during the Mexican Revolution